The Abbey Gateway is in Chester, Cheshire, England and leads from Northgate Street into Abbey Square.  It is recorded in the National Heritage List for England as a designated Grade I listed building.

History

The gateway was built as a gatehouse around 1300 and its upper storey was rebuilt around 1800.  It was formerly the main access to the precinct of St Werburgh's Abbey. It is thought that the architect was Richard Lenginour (Richard the Engineer).

Architecture

The gateway is built in red sandstone with gables to the front and rear.  The west face has a central arch for vehicles and a smaller arch to the south for pedestrians.  On each side of the central arch is a blind niche.  In the upper storey is a 16-pane window in a Gothic arch.  On the east face is one arch, larger than that on the west face.  In the upper storey is a central window in a Gothic arch with a rectangular window on each side.  In the gable end is another Gothic-shaped window.  To the south of the arch is a diminishing turret containing an arched doorway with a small window above it.

See also

Grade I listed buildings in Chester

References

Grade I listed buildings in Chester
Abbey Gateway
Gates in England
Grade I listed gates
Chester Cathedral
Gatehouses (architecture)